Gülizar Biçer Karaca (born 20 September 1967) in Denizli, Turkey, is a Turkish politician and lawyer.

Early life and career
Karaca graduated from Selçuk University's Faculty of Law in 1989. She worked as a freelance lawyer, and was the Secretary General of the Denizli Bar Association between 2000-2002

Political career
She started politics in the SHP, and later was in charge of managing the youth branches of the CHP in Denizli.

Karaca was a member of the Kınıklı Municipality Council between 1999-2004. Between 2005 and 2015, she was the chairman of the Atatürkist Thought Association's Denizli Branch. Karaca was elected to the Grand National Assembly of Turkey in the June 2015 elections, and was subsequently appointed a Clerk of the Presidency Council. She lost her seat in the November snap election. She was then elected a member of the CHP party council in 2016.

Karaca ran and regained a seat in the TBMM in the 2018 elections. And now serves as the CHP's vice chair for nature, and as of 2020 is the deputy chair for human rights.

Personal life
Karaca speaks intermediate level German, is married and has one child.

References 

1967 births
Living people
Turkish politicians
Turkish women lawyers
20th-century Turkish lawyers
21st-century Turkish lawyers